The Source is an album by Ali Farka Touré.

The album peaked at No. 1 on the Billboard World Albums chart.

Critical reception
The Los Angeles Times wrote that "one of the most impressive performances is on 'Cin quante Six,' a solo instrumental: Toure establishes a cleanly picked folk rhythm, then overlays a flamenco-flavored melody that suggests a meeting of Leo Kottke and the Gipsy Kings." Trouser Press called the album "most notable for the way it challenges the singer to move beyond blues ('Hawa Dolo') and to eschew simple guitar riffing for more intricate single-note lines ('Roucky')."

Track listing
 "Goye Kur" – 6:24
 "Inchana Massina" – 5:13
 "Roucky" – 8:18
 "Dofana" – 7:31
 "Karaw" – 6:28
 "Hawa Dolo" – 5:47
 "Cinquante Six" – 5:31
 "I Go Ka" – 3:59
 "Yenna" – 5:54
 "Mahini Me" – 5:24

Personnel
 Ali Farka Touré (vocals 1-6, 8-10; electric guitar 1-2,5,9; acoustic guitar 1,3-8,10; n'jarka 1; maracas 4)
 Afel Bocoum (vocals 1-2, 4-6; narration 4)
 Hamma Sankare (calabash 1,2,4,5,6,8; vocals 1,2,4,5)
 Oumar Touré (congas 2,5,6; vocals 2,5)
 Nitin Sawney (tabla 2)
 Taj Mahal (acoustic guitar 3,10)
 Roy McLeod (acoustic guitar 3)
 Groupe Asko (backing vocals 3,10)
 Amadou Cisse (calabash 9; vocals 9)

References

External links
 

1993 albums
Ali Farka Touré albums
World Circuit (record label) albums